Emmanuel Dasor (born 14 September 1995) is a Ghanaian sprinter specializing in the 200 meters and  400 meters races. He represented his country at the 2016 World Indoor Championships without advancing from the first round.

Competition record

Personal bests
Outdoor
100 metres – 10.41 (+1.6 m/s, Jonesboro 2014)
200 metres – 20.61 (+1.4 m/s, El Paso 2015)
400 metres – 45.61 (El Paso 2015)
Indoor
60 metres – 6.68 (Nashville 2016)
200 metres – 20.89 (Birmingham 2016)
400 metres – 46.21 (Birmingham 2016)

References

1995 births
Living people
Ghanaian male sprinters
Commonwealth Games competitors for Ghana
Athletes (track and field) at the 2014 Commonwealth Games
Athletes (track and field) at the 2015 African Games
Western Kentucky Hilltoppers and Lady Toppers athletes
Athletes (track and field) at the 2016 Summer Olympics
Olympic athletes of Ghana
African Games bronze medalists for Ghana
African Games medalists in athletics (track and field)
20th-century Ghanaian people
21st-century Ghanaian people